Con Dowdall (born 1945) is an Irish retired hurler who played as a right wing-forward for the Wexford senior team.

Born in Wexford, Dowdall first arrived on the inter-county scene at the age of seventeen two when he first linked up with the Wexford minor team, before later joining the under-21 side. He made his senior debut during the 1965 championship. Dowdall went on to play a bit part for Wexford over the next few years and won one Leinster medal.

At club level Dowdall won two championship medals with Faythe Harriers.

Throughout his inter-county career, Dowdall made just 4 championship appearances for Wexford. His retirement came following the conclusion of the 1971 championship.

His brother-in-law, Liam Bennett, also played with Wexford.

Honours

Team

Faythe Harriers
Wexford Senior Hurling Championship (2): 1965, 1981

Wexford
Leinster Senior Hurling Championship (1): 1965
All-Ireland Under-21 Hurling Championship (1): 1965
Leinster Under-21 Hurling Championship (2): 1965, 1966
All-Ireland Minor Hurling Championship (1): 1963
Leinster Minor Hurling Championship (2): 1963

References

1945 births
Living people
Faythe Harriers hurlers
Wexford inter-county hurlers